Total 13 is the second album by the Swedish rock band Backyard Babies. It was released in 1998 and produced by Thomas Skogsberg.

Track listing 

"Made Me Madman" – 2:23 (Dregen, Nicke Borg, Johan Blomquist)
"U.F.O. Romeo" – 2:44 (Nicke Borg, Dregen)
"Highlights" – 3:47 (Nicke Borg, Dregen)
"Get Dead" – 3:05 (Dregen, Nicke Borg)
"Look at You" – 2:44 (Nicke Borg, Dregen)
"Let's Go to Hell" – 3:13 (Nicke Borg)
"Spotlight the Sun" – 2:59 (Nicke Borg, Dregen)
"8-Balled" – 2:43 (Nicke Borg, Dregen, Nicke Andersson)
"Ghetto You" – 3:26 (Dregen, Nicke Borg)
"Subculture Hero" – 3:00 (Nicke Borg, Nicke Andersson, Dregen)
"Bombed (Out of My Mind)" – 2:55 (Nicke Borg, Dregen, Peder Carlsson)
"Hey, I'm Sorry" – 2:58 (Dregen, Peder Carlsson)
"Robber of Life" – 3:21 (Nicke Borg, Dregen)

International vinyl bonus track
"Backstabber"

Japanese CD bonus tracks
"Powderhead"
"Can't Find the Door"
"Wireless Mind"
"Rocker" (featuring Michael Monroe)

Other import/special edition bonus tracks
"Babylon"

1998 albums
Backyard Babies albums